Sew le sew is an Ethiopian television drama series produced by Bisrat Gemechu, Mesfin Getachew, Daniel Haile and Solomon Alemu, and is written by Tamiru Birhanu, Mesfin Getachew, Nebiyu Tekalegn, and Solomon Alemu Feleke. It originally aired on 16 March 2011 on EBC, formerly known as ETV. The series was concluded with its first season on 23 July 2014.

Synopsis 
This drama begins with an upper-class family. The family consists of Mesfin and his beloved wife Mahlet and their son Biruk. Mesfin and Mahlet struggle with a villainous character by the name of Asnake. He is an old friend of Mesfin's, but throughout time, Mesfin starts to realize the severity of Asnake’s evil actions. The hostility Asnake produces creates a large span of chaos, not only disrupting Mesfin’s family, but the families of many others. He has hidden criminal records of several illegal activities, such as smuggling goods and money laundering, and the police have come short to finding them.
Mesfin's son Biruk falls in love with Medhanit, a girl who has a brother named Tamerat and an overly protective mother. Through a series of events, Asnake ends up sending one of his henchman to kill Tamerat by chocking him to death right outside of Mesfin’s home. This single event is what pushes the story forward and creates multiple outlying storylines (minus Sosina and Adunya). Biruk, Mesfin’s son, ends up being falsefully blamed for the murder of Tamerat.

After multiple events and characters going through what seems like hell, all the evidence ends up pointing back to Asnake. Knowing that he has lost, his burning jealousy enrages and he decides to kill Mesfin and Mahlet. He is not successful though and is shot to death by Mahlet at a top story of a construction building. Ultimately, he falls down to his death and is impaled by a stick of wood in his abdomen.

Episodes

Controversy 
While the series aired, the national public broadcaster Ethiopian Broadcasting Corporation, formerly known as Ethiopian Television, challenged the producers to conclude the series on 22 March 2014. ETV was also accused of the unwillingness to (DStv) not air a translated version of the drama.

Cast and characters

References 

2011 television series debuts
2014 television series endings
Ethiopian crime drama television series
Police procedural television series
Mystery television series
Thriller television series